Peter Rotimi Oludipe is an Anglican bishop in Nigeria: he is currently the Bishop of Ijebu

Oludipe was born in Iwaya Ijebu, Ogun State. He was educated at St. Andrew's Primary School, Imuwen; Isonyin Grammar School, Isonyin-Ijebu; Ogun State School of Basic Studies, Ijebu Ode; and  Immanuel College of Theology, Ibadan.  Olidipe was ordained a deacon in 1991 and a priest in 1992. He served at Yemetu and Oke Bola. In 1998, he became a canon; and in 1999, an archdeacon. In 2010 he was appointed Provost of the Cathedral Church of Our Saviour,  Ijasi, Ijebu-Ode. On 21  September, 2020 he was consecrated Bishop of Ijebu.

Notes

External links
Enthronement and inauguration of the Rt Rev Dr Peter Rotimi Olipide

University of Ibadan alumni
Living people
People from Ogun State
Anglican bishops of Ijebu
21st-century Anglican bishops in Nigeria
Year of birth missing (living people)
Anglican archdeacons in Africa
Anglican provosts in Africa